Great Yarmouth Winter Gardens is a grade II* listed building in Great Yarmouth, England.

It was built of glass and iron in Torquay over 3 years starting 1878. It was moved to Great Yarmouth in 1904 by barge and rebuilt. It reopened in 1906.

In 2018, it was named among the top ten endangered buildings of the Victorian and Edwardian eras in a survey released by the Victorian Society.

In July 2021 it received a £10 million National Lottery Heritage Fund grant to support its repair and reopening.

See also
 Grade II* listed buildings in Great Yarmouth

References

External links

Grade II* listed buildings in Norfolk
Great Yarmouth